Friends of the Los Angeles River (FoLAR) is a 501(c)(3) non-profit organization founded in California in 1986, whose mission is to protect and restore the natural and historic heritage of the Los Angeles River and its riparian habitat. The group was initially founded by area performance artist Lewis MacAdams in conjunction with other artists and architects, following a foot tour of the "latter day urban hell" of the river.

References

External links 
 

Environmental organizations based in California
Los Angeles River
Water organizations in the United States
1986 establishments in California
Think tanks established in 1986